Palaeoneura is a genus of wasps belonging to the family Mymaridae.

The species of this genus are found in Northern America and Australia.

Species:

Palaeoneura durwest 
Palaeoneura evanescens 
Palaeoneura frater 
Palaeoneura gloriosa 
Palaeoneura interrupta 
Palaeoneura markhoddlei 
Palaeoneura mymaripennis 
Palaeoneura turneri

References

Mymaridae
Hymenoptera genera